Cyosoprocta is a genus of bristle flies in the family Tachinidae. There are at least two described species in Cyosoprocta.

Species
These two species belong to the genus Cyosoprocta:
 Cyosoprocta auriceps Reinhard, 1952 c g
 Cyosoprocta funebris Reinhard, 1952 c g
Data sources: i = ITIS, c = Catalogue of Life, g = GBIF, b = Bugguide.net

References

Further reading

External links

 
 

Tachinidae